Medan Kota is one of 21 districts in the city of Medan, North Sumatra, Indonesia.

Boundaries of the district (Indonesian: kecamatan):
 To the north : Medan Area, Medan Perjuangan, Medan Timur
 To the south : Medan Amplas
 To the east  : Medan Denai, Medan Area
 To the west  : Medan Maimun

In 2004, it had a population of 84.530 inhabitants. Total area is 5,27 km2  and the population density is 16.039,85  inhabitants/km2.

Residents  
A large part of the population in the Chinese, followed by Malays and other ethnics.

Interesting Places 
 Great Mosque of Medan (مسجد رايا ميدان)
 Teladan Stadium, Sport Complex
 Bukit Barisan Heroes' Cemetery
 Sri Deli Park (تامن سري دلي)

Districts of Medan